Rıfat Çalışkan (born 10 July 1940) is a former Turkish cyclist. He competed in the individual road race at the 1972 Summer Olympics.

References

External links
 

1940 births
Living people
Turkish male cyclists
Olympic cyclists of Turkey
Cyclists at the 1972 Summer Olympics
Place of birth missing (living people)